The Lay Buddhist Ordination (Japanese: , Korean: sugye (수계) refers to the public ordination ceremony wherein a lay follower of Zen Buddhism receives certain Buddhist precepts. The particulars of the ceremony differ widely by country and by school of Buddhism.

China
In China, the ritual, is called shòu-jiè (受戒). The character 受 means "receive," while 戒 means "precepts." Taken together, the characters translate as "initiated" or "ordained."

Many people believe in Buddhism but do not go through any initiation ceremonies. Such Buddhists make up the overwhelming majority. Only a small part of Buddhists have gone through the ceremony which makes the recipient an upasaka or upasika and accepted the five commandments. They are formal Buddhists.

Lewis Hodous, in his 1920 book Buddhism and Buddhists in China remarks on the Chinese ceremony as well, after recording an initiation ceremony for both those entering monastic life and the laity: "Less private was the initiation of the lay brethren and sisters, more lightly branded on the right wrist, while all about intoned 'Na-mah Pen-shih Shih-chia-mou-ni Fo.' (I put my trust in my Original Teacher, Säkyamuni-Buddha.)" In pinyin and Chinese, this would be written as "Námó Běnshī Shìjiāmóunífó" (南無本師釋迦牟尼佛).

Japan
In Japan, the ritual is called jukai.

Sōtō school
In the Sōtō school in the United States, lay initiates take refuge in the Three Jewels (or Three Refuges--Buddha, Dharma and Sangha), the Three Pure Precepts (to do no harm, to do only good, and to do good for others) and the Five Grave Precepts--Affirm life: do not kill; Be giving: do not take what is not freely given; Honor the body: do not engage in sexual misconduct; 
Manifest truth: do not speak falsely; and Proceed clearly: do not cloud the mind with intoxicants.

Rinzai school
In the Rinzai school students take refuge in the Three Jewels (or Three Refuges) and, similarly to the Chinese and Korean practices derived from India, they receive the five precepts for laypersons.

South Korea

In South Korea, the ritual, called sugye (수계), involves formally taking refuge in The Three Jewels of Buddhism: the Buddha, the Dharma, and the Sangha, and accepting the five precepts. During the ritual, the initiate is touched with a burning incense stick. This is to leave a permanent mark which serves to remind the initiate of their promise to uphold the five precepts. During (or right after) the ceremony, the initiate is given a Buddhist name.

United States
In the United States, the predominant rite of receiving precepts is based on the Japanese Zen traditions. According to Seager, "jukai is a formal rite of passage that marks entrance into the Buddhist community. At that time, a student is given a Dharma name. He or she also makes a commitment to the precepts, which are interpreted a bit differently in various communities." 

In the Diamond Sangha, jukai is "commonly practiced" though some members never undergo the ceremony because they are members of another religion which prohibits such initiations. Therefore, some would say, they are not Buddhist by definition.

At the Rochester Zen Center and its affiliated centers, the jukai ceremony involves taking the same precepts as in the Soto and White Plum traditions; however, from school to school or lineage to lineage, interpretation and translation of precepts can vary.

The White Plum Asanga follows the same ritual as the Japanese Soto-school.

Notes

References

Further reading

External links

Buddhist rituals
Rites of passage
Initiation